The MATS Institute of Management & Entrepreneurship was founded in 2001 as the first business school by The JGI Group.

References

External links

 Business schools in Bangalore